Clint Holmes (born 9 May 1946) is a British-born singer-songwriter and Las Vegas entertainer, and TV announcer.

Bio
He was born in Bournemouth, England, the son of an African-American jazz musician and an English opera singer. He was raised in Farnham, New York, a small village southwest of Buffalo.

Initially a vocal music student at Fredonia State College, Holmes left school for the U.S. Army during the Vietnam War. He spent his three-year enlistment (1967–1969) with the  United States Army Chorus, and then remained in the Washington, D.C. area to launch his civilian career, singing in nightclubs.

Music career
In June 1972, Holmes released his first and only hit record, "Playground in My Mind". It didn't reach the Hot 100 chart until 24 March 1973, whereupon it rose to #2 on 16–23 June 1973. It became one of the biggest hits of the year internationally.

The following account was given in the autobiography, Johnny Holliday: From Rock to Jock:
I also helped break a record at WWDC. It was a tune called 'Playground of My Mind,' written by Paul Vance, whom I had known from my WINS days in the Big Apple. Clint Holmes, an excellent talent just waiting to be discovered, recorded it. Clint had found his local audience at Mr. Day's in Georgetown and various other D.C. nightspots. When Clint's record promoter dropped the single off at WWDC, we just jumped all over it. It became a hit overnight. Clint is the sort of fellow you just automatically like the first time you meet him. He and I played tennis at Candy Cane Park in Silver Spring and shot a ton of hoops together. He's a good athlete. I couldn't be prouder of what Clint has accomplished in his career. After 'Playground' hit, he became Joan Rivers' sideman on her short-lived late night show on Fox, and then he got his own TV gig on WOR-TV in NYC.

Television
Holmes was the announcer for The Late Show Starring Joan Rivers (1986–1988), the initial broadcast offering of the then-new Fox Broadcasting Company. In 1991 he hosted "New York at Night," a talk show that aired on WWOR in New York City for a year and won a local Emmy.

In 1996, The New York Times Theater Review stated; "Comfortable Shoes" written and performed by Holmes: "Whether you choose to endure two and a half hours of Mr. Holmes acting and singing it out, with the assistance of seven other actors and singers, is up to your tolerance for ego-driven show-biz excursions into the orbit of the vanities. It is also dependent on your predisposition to Mr. Holmes's talents. And it has a lot to do with your need for an assertiveness-training manual in the guise of musical theater...it looks as if Mr. Holmes wrote the book on self-indulgence."

Holmes has been a Las Vegas show attraction since the early 1970s. In 2006, he closed his headlining show at Harrah's Las Vegas Casino, which renamed its main showroom for him. From 1990 to 1995, he hosted Honda Campus All-Star Challenge on the BET network, and, after the event became non-broadcast, continued to host the final matches through 2008. Most of Holmes' Vegas band members also appear in a locally popular R&B/jazz group, Santa Fe and The Fat City Horns. He appeared on the cruise ship Gallaxy, as an entertainer also starring Jane McDonald.

Holmes has annually returned to Buffalo each March to co-host the annual Variety Kids telethon on WKBW-TV.

With the opening of the Smith Center for the Performing Arts in 2012, Holmes performs monthly in the Cabaret Jazz Theater.

He performed "Auld Lang Syne" in the Smith Center in Las Vegas, following the New Year's celebration's firework show on January 1, 2016.

See also
 List of 1970s one-hit wonders in the United States

References

External links

Clint Holmes website 
Clint Holmes on "Talktails" (Vegas Video Network) 
The Santa Fe and The Fat City Horns blogsite

1946 births
Living people
American game show hosts
British emigrants to the United States

Singers from New York (state)
Musicians from Buffalo, New York
People from the Las Vegas Valley
United States Army soldiers
Epic Records artists
State University of New York at Fredonia alumni
Las Vegas shows
20th-century African-American male singers